Marco Carraretto (born October 27, 1977) is an Italian former professional basketball player for Fortitudo Bologna and other teams in Italy. He is a 1.97 m (6 ft 5¾ in) tall, 95 kg shooting guard-small forward.

Professional career
Carraretto began his pro career with the Italian League club Benetton Basket Treviso during the 1996-97 season. He then moved to Basket Mestre. He then joined Snaidero Udine, followed by Muller Verona, and then Pallacanestro Biella.

He then moved to the Spanish ACB League club TAU Cerámica, before moving to Breogan Lugo. He then joined Montepaschi Siena and stayed there for seven seasons.

In September 2013, he returned to his former club Scaligera Verona.

Italian national team
Carraretto played with the Italian national basketball team at the 2005 Mediterranean Games, where he won the gold medal.

References

External links
 Euroleague.net Profile
 Italian League Profile 
 Spanish League Profile 

Living people
1977 births
CB Breogán players
Italian men's basketball players
Italian expatriate basketball people in Spain
Liga ACB players
Mens Sana Basket players
Pallacanestro Biella players
Pallacanestro Treviso players
Saski Baskonia players
Shooting guards
Small forwards
Mediterranean Games gold medalists for Italy
Competitors at the 2005 Mediterranean Games
Mediterranean Games medalists in basketball